Jargalant Khairkhan (blissful holy mountain) is a mountain in Mongolia, located in the Khovd Province. The mountain rises above Khar-Us Nuur (lake), in Khar-Us Nuur National Park.

See also
 List of Ultras of Central Asia
 List of mountains in Mongolia

References

External links
 "Jargalant Khairkhan, Mongolia" on Peakbagger

Mountains of Mongolia
Altai Mountains
Khovd Province